Germarostes aphodioides is a species of pill scarab beetle in the family Hybosoridae. It is found in North America.

Subspecies
These two subspecies belong to the species Germarostes aphodioides:
 Germarostes aphodioides aphodioides g
 Germarostes aphodioides prionomus (Bates, 1887) c g
Data sources: i = ITIS, c = Catalogue of Life, g = GBIF, b = Bugguide.net

References

Further reading

 
 
 
 

scarabaeiformia
Articles created by Qbugbot
Beetles described in 1800